Labeobarbus axelrodi is a species of ray-finned fish in the  family Cyprinidae. It is endemic to the Kouliou River in Africa.

Named  for  Herbert Axelrod  in recognition  of his  continuing  generous  support  for  ichthyological  research  and exploration.

References

axelrodi
Taxa named by Melanie Stiassny
Fish described in 2004